Précy is a commune in the Cher department in the Centre-Val de Loire region of France.

Geography
The river Vauvise forms all of the commune's northern boundary.

Population

Sights
 The church of St. Louis, dating from the sixteenth century.
 A feudal motte at the place known as Château de Faye.
 A seventeenth-century chateau.
 A converted watermill.

See also
Communes of the Cher department

References

Communes of Cher (department)